The Bunak language (also known as Bunaq, Buna', Bunake, pronounced ) is the language of the Bunak people of the mountainous region of central Timor, split between the political boundary between West Timor, Indonesia, particularly in Lamaknen District and East Timor. It is one of the few on Timor which is not an Austronesian language, but rather a Papuan language of the Timor-Alor-Pantar language family. The language is surrounded by Malayo-Polynesian languages, like Uab Meto and Tetum.

Bunak distinguishes between animate and inanimate noun classes.

Phonology 

 Plosive sounds /p t k/ can be heard as unreleased allophones [p̚ t̚ k̚], in word-final position.

 Sounds /b d ɡ/ can be heard as [β r ɣ] in intervocalic positions.

 /ɡ/ can be heard as [dʒ] when preceding /i/.

 /z/ can have allophones [ʒ dʒ] in free variation.

 /tʃ/ is heard as [s] when preceding /i/.

 /l/ in word-final position can also be heard as a fricative [ɬ] in free variation.

Pronouns
Pronouns seem to tie Bunak more closely to the Alor–Pantar languages, in a group Ross (2005) calls "West Timor", than with the Papuan East Timor languages. The independent pronouns and object prefixes, which appear to retain the proto-Trans–New Guinea dual suffix *-li, are as follows:

Notes

References

External links 
 ELAR archive of Zapal, an oral literature genre of the Bunaq Lamaknen
 Timothy Usher, New Guinea World, Bunaq

Languages of Indonesia
Languages of East Timor
Timor–Alor–Pantar languages